Tann-Dürnten railway station is a railway station in the Swiss canton of Zurich. The station is situated in the municipality of Dürnten and takes its name from the nearby village of Tann. It is located on the Tösstalbahn between Winterthur and Rapperswil, and is served by Zurich S-Bahn line S26.

References 

Railway stations in the canton of Zürich
Swiss Federal Railways stations
Dürnten